Art of Doubt is the seventh studio album by Canadian indie rock band Metric, which was released on 21 September 2018. The first single, "Dark Saturday", was released on 13 July 2018, followed by "Dressed to Suppress" on 26 July, and "Now or Never Now" on 4 September. On 13 September NPR published a live stream of the album.

Background
Art of Doubt was produced by Justin Meldal-Johnsen, and recorded at EastWest Studios in Los Angeles, and at Metric's studio, Giant Studio, in Toronto. The album design and cover are designed by longtime Metric collaborator Justin Broadbent.

Critical response

Art of Doubt received generally positive reviews from music critics. At Metacritic, which assigns a normalized rating out of 100 to reviews from mainstream critics, the album received an average score of 73, based on 11 reviews, which indicates "generally favorable reviews".

Track listing

Charts

References

2018 albums
Metric (band) albums
Albums produced by Justin Meldal-Johnsen
Albums recorded at EastWest Studios